Alfred Cole may refer to:

Al Cole, boxer
Alfred Jack Cole (scientist)
Alfred Cole, sole survivor of Allen Gardiner (schooner) disaster
Alfred Clayton Cole (1854–1920), merchant and director of the Bank of England, Governor of the Bank of England from 1911 to 1913
C. Alfred Cole, on List of bishops of the Episcopal Church in the United States of America